The Indianapolis White Castle #3 was built in 1927 and is located on Fort Wayne Avenue in Indianapolis, Indiana. The building is the third oldest restaurant in the White Castle hamburger chain in the United States, and the oldest White Castle building in Indiana.

Architecture
The Indianapolis White Castle #3 composed of white enamel-glazed brick, a unique feature that can be found only on White Castle buildings constructed between 1924 and 1929. The building also features many castle elements including battlements, buttresses on the front façade, and a corner tower.

History
Built in 1927, Indianapolis White Castle #3 was originally smaller than its current size with only a small counter bar and stools for customers inside. The building underwent interior renovations in the 1930s and exterior renovations in the 1950s. During a 1950s renovation, an addition was added to the southwest elevation to better serve carryout patrons. The Indianapolis White Castle #3 was listed on the National Register of Historic Places in 2011 for both its architecture and its contribution to American society during the fast food revolution. The building operated under the fast food chain from 1927 to 1979 and was the longest operating fast food restaurant in the country.

See also

 National Register of Historic Places listings in Center Township, Marion County, Indiana
 White Castle Building No. 8

References

External links

 
 

Defunct restaurants in Indianapolis
1927 establishments in Indiana
White Castle (restaurant)
Commercial buildings on the National Register of Historic Places in Indiana
Commercial buildings completed in 1927
National Register of Historic Places in Indianapolis
Restaurants on the National Register of Historic Places